Sandro Silva de Souza or simply Sandro (born May 17, 1988 in Rio de Janeiro), is a Brazilian centre back who plays for Brusque.

External links

 zerozero.pt
 globoesporte
 Sandro

1988 births
Living people
Brazilian footballers
Fluminense FC players
Ituano FC players
Figueirense FC players
Joinville Esporte Clube players
Ceará Sporting Club players
Santa Cruz Futebol Clube players
Criciúma Esporte Clube players
Renofa Yamaguchi FC players
J2 League players
Campeonato Brasileiro Série A players
Campeonato Brasileiro Série B players
Association football defenders
Expatriate footballers in Kuwait
Expatriate footballers in Japan
Brazilian expatriate sportspeople in Kuwait
Brazilian expatriate sportspeople in Japan
Kazma SC players
Kuwait Premier League players
Footballers from Rio de Janeiro (city)